Leonard Jeffries Jr. (born January 19, 1937) is former departmental chair of Black Studies at the City College of New York, part of the City University of New York (CUNY). Jeffries is a political scientist, historian, educator, master-teacher/administrator and Pan-Africanist. He was born and raised in Newark, New Jersey, where he first developed his leadership skills and Pan-African consciousness. He is the uncle of U.S. Representative Hakeem Jeffries.  

Known for his Pan-African Afrocentrist views that the role of African people in history and the accomplishments of African Americans are far more important than commonly held, Jeffries has urged that public school syllabi be made less Eurocentric. He is a founding director and a former vice president and president of the Association for the Study of Classical African Civilizations (ASCAC).

Jeffries's claims that Jewish businessmen financed the Atlantic slave trade and used the movie industry to hurt black people, and that whites are "ice people" while Africans are "sun people", received national publicity in the early 1990s. Jeffries was discharged from his position as chair of CUNY's Black Studies Department, leading to a long legal battle that ended with the courts affirming the college's right to remove him from the position due to his incendiary remarks.

Academic career 

Jeffries attended Lafayette College for his undergraduate work. At Lafayette, he pledged, and was accepted into, the fraternity Pi Lambda Phi. In his senior year, Jeffries was elected president of the fraternity. After graduating with honors in 1959, he won a Rotary International fellowship to the University of Lausanne in Switzerland. In 1961, he began study at Columbia University's School of International Affairs, from which he received a master's degree in 1965.

At the same time, Jeffries worked for Operation Crossroads Africa, allowing him to spend time in Guinea, Mali, Senegal, and the Ivory Coast. He became the program coordinator for West Africa in 1965. Jeffries became a political science instructor at City College of New York (CCNY) in 1969 and received his doctorate from Columbia University in 1971 with a dissertation on politics in the Ivory Coast. He became the founding chairman of Black Studies at San Jose State College in California. A year later, he became a tenured professor at CCNY and chair of its new Black Studies Department.

Jeffries chaired CCNY's Black Studies Department for over two decades, recruiting like-minded scholars and attempting to expand the number of faculty and students within or associated with the department. During his tenure, the department sponsored/hosted/organized 25 major national and international conferences and seminars. Besides administration and teaching, Jeffries often traveled to Africa and served in the African Heritage Studies Association, a group seeking to define and develop the Black Studies discipline.

Jeffries became popular among students and as a speaker at college campuses and public organizations. He is known for his Pan-African Afrocentrist views—that the role of African people in history and the accomplishments of African Americans are far more important than commonly held.

Jeffries is a proponent of melanin theory, which posits that greater skin pigmentation makes Black people inherently superior to white people. He says melanin allows Black people to "negotiate the vibrations of the universe and to deal with the ultraviolet rays of the sun". Jeffries has stated (but not published) the idea that whites are "ice people" who are violent and cruel, while blacks are "sun people" who are compassionate and peaceful; historian Mia Bay attributes the origins of this hypothesis to the writings of anthropologist Cheik Anta Diop as well as Michael Bradley, author of The Iceman Inheritance.

During a 1991 speech at the Empire State Black Arts and Cultural Festival in Albany, New York, Jeffries asserted that Russian Jews and the American Mafia were behind a conspiracy of Hollywood film producers to denigrate Black people, and that Jews had also controlled the Atlantic slave trade. His remarks were broadcast on cable television, drawing angry responses from Italian and Jewish Americans.

Removal as chairman and legal battles (1990s) 
In 1992, Jeffries first got his term shortened from three years to one, and then was removed as chair of the department of African-American studies, but allowed to stay as a professor. He sued the school, and in August 1993 a federal jury found that his First Amendment rights had been violated. But Jeffries had been unanimously reappointed as chair. He was awarded $400,000 in damages (later reduced to $360,000).

The school appealed, but the federal appeals court upheld the verdict while removing the damages. The CUNY Institute for Research on the Diaspora in the Americas and Caribbean was created to do black research independent of Jeffries's department. It was headed by Edmund W. Gordon, who had led the Black Studies Department before Jeffries was reinstated.

In November 1994, the Supreme Court told the appeals court to reconsider after a related Supreme Court decision. The appeals court reversed its decision in April 1995, and in June, Professor Moyibi Amodo was elected to succeed Jeffries as department chair.

Academic freedom debate 
Jeffries's case led to debate about tenure, academic freedom and free speech. He was sometimes compared to Michael Levin, a CUNY professor who outside the classroom claimed that black people are inferior, and had recently won against the school in court.

One interpretation of Jeffries's case is that while a university cannot fire a professor for opinions and speech, it has more flexibility with a position like department chair. Another is that it allows public institutions to discipline employees in general for disruptive speech.

Works 
Jeffries's Pan-African activities include 20 major international and national consultancies involving the United Nations (U.N.), United Nations Development Program (UNDP), UNESCO, UNAIDS, USAID, and the Peace Corps, as well as the states of New Jersey, California and New York. His State of New York consultancy allowed him to produce the historical document A Curriculum of Inclusion, calling for changing school curricula to include African, Asian and Latino families.

References

Further reading

External links 
  – via the National Black United Front
 A Curriculum of Inclusion
 

1937 births
Living people
African-American academics
Afrocentrists
American pan-Africanists
City College of New York faculty
School of International and Public Affairs, Columbia University alumni
Lafayette College alumni
Pseudohistorians
San Jose State University faculty
University of Lausanne alumni
Writers from Newark, New Jersey
Proponents of melanin theory
20th-century African-American people
Antisemitism in the United States